The 1996 United States presidential election in Illinois took place on November 5, 1996, as part of the 1996 United States presidential election. Voters chose 22 representatives, or electors to the Electoral College, who voted for president and vice president.

Illinois was won by President Bill Clinton (D) over Senator Bob Dole (R-KS), with Clinton winning 54.32% to 36.81% for a margin of 17.51%. Billionaire businessman Ross Perot (Reform Party of the United States of America-TX) finished in third, with 8.03 percent of the popular vote. 

, this is the last election in which Bond County, Christian County, Clay County, Clinton County, Fayette County, Greene County, Hamilton County, Hancock County, Hardin County, Jefferson County, Jersey County, Lawrence County, Marion County, Marshall County, Massac County, Moultrie County, Piatt County, Pike County, Pope County, Randolph County, Saline County, Shelby County, Union County, White County, and Williamson County voted for a Democratic Presidential candidate. Clinton became the first Democrat to win the White House without carrying Brown County since John F. Kennedy in 1960.

As of 2020, this marks the most recent time Illinois voted more Democratic than Maryland.

Primaries

Turnout
For the state-run primaries (Democratic, Republican, and Libertarian), turnout was 26.46%, with 1,620,768 votes cast. For the general election, turnout was 64.70%, with 4,311,391 votes cast.

State-run primaries were held for the Democratic, Republican, and Libertarian parties on March 19.

Democratic

The 1996 Illinois Democratic presidential primary was held on March 19, 1996 in the U.S. state of Illinois as one of the Democratic Party's statewide nomination contests ahead of the 1996 presidential election.

Incumbent president Bill Clinton secured a victory with no major opposition.

Republican

The 1996 Illinois Republican presidential primary was held on March 19, 1996 in the U.S. state of Illinois as one of the Republican Party's statewide nomination contests ahead of the 1996 presidential election.

Libertarian

The 1996 Illinois Libertarian presidential primary was held on March 19, 1996 in the U.S. state of Illinois as one of the Libertarian Party's statewide nomination contests ahead of the 1996 presidential election. It was a non-binding preference primary, from which no delegates were awarded.

General election

Results by county

See also
 Presidency of Bill Clinton
 United States presidential elections in Illinois

Notes

References

Illinois
1996
1996 Illinois elections